Ab Difeh (also Romanized as Āb Dīfeh) is a village in Shahi Rural District, Sardasht District, Dezful County, Khuzestan Province, Iran. At the 2006 census, its population was 55, in 8 families.

References 

Populated places in Dezful County